The Volán companies were a network of transit companies operating intercity, international and city bus lines in Hungary. One Volán company generally served only the area of a specific county. The companies formed from the merger of regional Auto Transit Companies and Cargo Shipping Companies.

See also 

 Budapesti Közlekedési Központ
 BKV Zrt.

References 

Public transport companies in Hungary